Shahpurabad is a city in Isfahan Province, Iran.

Shahpurabad may also refer to:
Shahpurabad Industrial Area, Isfahan Province
Shahpurabad, Kermanshah
Shahpurabad, Aligudarz, Lorestan Province
Shahpurabad, Selseleh, Lorestan Province